Jatara Assembly constituency is one of the 230 Vidhan Sabha (Legislative Assembly) constituencies of Madhya Pradesh state in central India. This constituency is reserved for the candidates belonging to the Scheduled castes since 2008, following the delimitation of the legislative assembly constituencies. It came into existence in 1951, as one of the 48 Vidhan Sabha constituencies of the erstwhile Vindhya Pradesh state.

Overview
Jatara (constituency number 44) is one of the 3 Vidhan Sabha constituencies located in Tikamgarh district. This constituency covers the Jatara and Lidhorakhas nagar panchayats and parts of Jatara and Palera tehsils of the district.

Jatara is part of Tikamgarh Lok Sabha constituency along with seven other Vidhan Sabha segments, namely, Tikamgarh, Prithvipur, Niwari and Khargapur in this district and Maharajpur, Chhatarpur and Bijawar in Chhatarpur district.

Members of Legislative Assembly

As a constituency of Madhya Bharat

 1951: Narain Das, Indian National Congress

As a constituency of Madhya Pradesh

Election results

2013 results

See also
 Jatara
 Lidhorakhas

References

Tikamgarh district
Assembly constituencies of Madhya Pradesh